Alokananda Roy is an Indian actress known for her work in Bengali cinema and theatre. She made her thespian debut at the age of seven in the 1951 and later on became part of numerous Bengali plays. She made her screen debut with Satyajit Ray's Kanchenjungha (1962). She received a BFJA Award for her role in Buddhadeb Dasgupta's Bengali film Phera (1988). She appeared in National Award winning films such as Paromitar Ek Din, Utsab, Prohor and Netaji Subhas Chandra Bose: The Forgotten Hero.

Acting career 
After Sharmila Tagore was compelled to decline the role of Manisha in Satyajit Ray's Kanchenjungha (1962), the latter zeroed upon Alokananda Roy to play the character. Ray had to convince her father and her uncle as well that the role was sober enough to play. The film did not perform well at the box office.

In 1978, She returned to stage with the Bengali play Acharya directed by Shekhar Chatterjee. She featured opposite Soumitra Chatterjee for near about ten years, in the Bengali play Homapakhi directed by the latter. She starred as Rangapishima in Rituparno Ghosh's Bengali thriller TV series Tahar Namti Ranjana. Due to the sudden demise of Ghosh, the series was never carried on after completion of the first episode.

Awards

Filmography

Hindi film

Bengali film

Bengali TV series

References

External links

Alokananda Roy on calcuttayellowpage

Actresses in Bengali cinema
Indian film actresses